Kil Municipality (Kils kommun) is a municipality in Värmland County in west central Sweden. Its seat is located in the town of Kil.

The local government reform of 1971 amalgamated Stora Kil, Järnskog and a part of Brunskog, thus forming Kil Municipality.

Kil means wedge, crack or similar in Swedish, in this case referring to a bay (old Swedish). The name is at least from the fifteenth century, referring to a bay by the small lake Hyn, where the church was constructed. The town later became the seat of the juridical Kil Hundred, which is known to have existed in 1426. The wedge is noted in the coat of arms.

The town is notable as the location of Sweden's first railroad in 1849.

Localities
Fagerås
Högboda
Kil (seat)

Sister cities
Laihia, Finland
Skuodas, Lithuania
Svinninge, Denmark
Trysil, Norway

References

External links

Kil Municipality - Official site
Kil.just.nu

Municipalities of Värmland County